The 1919 West Virginia Mountaineers football team represented the West Virginia Mountaineers during the 1919 college football season. The Mountaineers completed the regular season with an 8–2 record.

As a senior, in 1919, Ira Rodgers had one of the greatest seasons of any player from WVU. Rodgers led the nation in scoring with 147 points on 19 touchdowns and 33 extra-point kicks. He also threw 11 touchdown passes, which was a rare feat for that era and a WVU record until 1949. Rodgers earned consensus All-American honors that season, the first All-American in WVU history.

Schedule

References

West Virginia
West Virginia Mountaineers football seasons
West Virginia Mountaineers football